Počenice-Tetětice is a municipality in Kroměříž District in the Zlín Region of the Czech Republic. It has about 700 inhabitants.

Administrative parts
The municipality is made up of villages of Počenice and Tetětice.

References

Villages in Kroměříž District